Flavia Camp Canfield (January 28, 1844 – August 12, 1930) was an American artist, author, and founder of the Columbus Federation of Women's Clubs.

Early life
Flavia Camp was raised in Black Earth, Wisconsin by her mother and step-father, the Congregational pastor Asa A. Allen, with a combined total of fifteen siblings, half-siblings, and step-siblings. She taught in a local school in her late teens, and went to the University of Wisconsin in 1863, the first year it admitted women. 

On June 24, 1873 she married James Hulme Canfield with whom she had a son and in 1879 a daughter Dorothy. Although she didn't speak any foreign languages, she made many trips to Europe with her daughter, for example studying art for a year in Paris.

Organisational work
Canfield became interested in the nascent Women's Club Movement, and accordingly while her husband was president of Ohio State University, she began a campaign to organize and federate clubs in the Columbus region. In all she founded 26 such clubs and the Columbus Federation of Women's Clubs. She was the first president (1895–97) of the Ohio State University Women's Club, and was president of the Ohio Federation of Women's Clubs from 1898–1900.

Canfield continued her interest in the arts as president of The Columbus Art Association, in which role she "broadened the policy of the association and enlarged the membership".

Literary legacy
Her published novels include The Kidnapped Campers: A Story of Out-of-Doors (1908), The Refugee Family: A Story for Girls (1919), The Big Tent (1921), and Around the World at Eighty (1925).

Being made the subject of satire in "Flavia and Her Artists", a short story by her daughter Dorothy's friend Willa Cather, was probably the cause for the 10-year rift between Dorothy and Cather.

References 

1844 births
1930 deaths
20th-century American novelists
American women artists
American women novelists
People from Black Earth, Wisconsin
Writers from Columbus, Ohio
Novelists from Wisconsin
Artists from Wisconsin
Artists from Ohio
University of Wisconsin–Madison alumni
20th-century American women writers
Novelists from Ohio